Richard Alfred Farrimond (born 15 September 1947) is a British engineer, former army officer and astronaut. He is currently a history PhD student at King's College London.

Born in Birkenhead (Cheshire), he was educated Clifton College. He studied at the Royal Military Academy, Sandhurst and received a BSc in telecommunications at the Royal Military College of Science, Shrivenham in 1972. At the end of his military career he was Lieutenant-Colonel in the Royal Corps of Signals of the British Army. After leaving the Army, he worked for British Aerospace, later for Matra Marconi Space and finally with Astrium. On retirement he studied at King's College London for a history master's degree and his dissertation on 'Britain and Human Space Flight' was published.
In July 1984 he was chosen, from the candidates of RAF and Royal Navy, as the backup crew payload specialist to fly with the Space Shuttle mission STS-61-H, which was planned to deliver the British Skynet 4A satellite to space. However, after the Challenger accident this space flight was cancelled, and he left the space program without having flown into orbit.

Sources

1947 births
British astronauts
Living people
Royal Corps of Signals officers
People from Birkenhead
Graduates of the Royal Military Academy Sandhurst
People educated at Clifton College
20th-century British Army personnel